This is a list of religious places in Wayanad, a district in Kerala, India.

Thirunelly Temple and Papanashini, Thirunelly, it is believed that the temple is more than 1000 years old.
Valliyoorkkavu Bhagavathi Temple, it is an important worship place for the Wayanad tribal communities.
Lourde Matha Shrine, Pallikunnu Church, it was built by a French priest Fr. Jefreno in 1908. 
Kallody church St. George Forane Church Kallody, Wayanad, one of the old Church.

Varambetta Mosque Mananthavady, it is an old Mosque which is about 300 years old.
Malankarakunnu St.Thomas Church, it is the oldest Malankara Jacobite Syriac Orthodox Church in Malabar region.
Seetha Lava Kusha Temple, it is a place dedicated to celestial worship and has a distinctive position among the Kerala temples.
Puliyarmala Jain temple, it is temple is also called as Anathanatha swami temple.
Assumption Forane Church, Sulthan Bathery, French Missionaries who started the church in 1900.
Mor Baselious Jacobite Syrian Church, Cheeyambam, Pulpally On foot Pilgrimage from churches in Malabar on fest of St.Yeldho Mar Baselios.
EAE St.Marys Soonoro Pilgrim Church Meenangadi, holds The Soonoro of St.Mary and relics of Patriarch H.H Ignatius Elias III.

References

Religious buildings and structures in Wayanad district
Wayanad religious sites
India religion-related lists